Toleration is the allowing, permitting, or acceptance of an action, idea, object, or person which one dislikes or disagrees with.  Political scientist Andrew R. Murphy explains that "We can improve our understanding by defining "toleration" as a set of social or political practices and "tolerance" as a set of attitudes." Random House Dictionary defines tolerance as "a fair, objective, and permissive attitude toward those whose opinions, beliefs, practices, racial or ethnic origins, etc., differ from one's own".

Both these concepts inherently contain the idea of alterity, the state of otherness. Additional choices of how to respond to the "other," beyond toleration, do exist. Therefore, in some instances, toleration has been seen as 'a flawed virtue' because it concerns acceptance of things that were better overcome. Toleration cannot, therefore, be defined as a universal good, and many of its applications and uses remain contested.

Religious toleration may signify "no more than forbearance and the permission given by the adherents of a dominant religion for other religions to exist, even though the latter are looked on with disapproval as inferior, mistaken, or harmful". Historically, most incidents and writings pertaining to toleration involve the status of minority and dissenting viewpoints in relation to a dominant state religion. However, religion is also sociological, and the practice of toleration has always had a political aspect as well.

Toleration assumes there is a conflict over something important, something that cannot otherwise be resolved through normal negotiation without resorting to war or violence.  As political lecturer Catriona McKinnon explains, when it comes to questions like what is "the best way to live, the right things to think, the ideal political society, or the true road to salvation, no amount of negotiation and bargaining will bring them to an agreement without at least one party relinquishing the commitments that created the conflict in the first place.  Such conflicts provide the circumstances of toleration... [and] are endemic in society." "The urgency and relevance of this issue is only too obvious: without tolerance, communities that value diversity, equality and peace could not persist (Vogt, 1997)."

An overview of the history of toleration and different cultures in which toleration has been practiced, and the ways in which such a paradoxical concept has developed into a guiding one, illuminates its contemporary use as political, social, religious, and ethnic, applying to LGBT individuals and other minorities, and other connected concepts such as human rights.

Etymology
Originally from the Latin tolerans (present participle of tolerare; "to bear, endure, tolerate"), the word tolerance was first used in Middle French in the 14th century and in Early Modern English in the early 15th century. The word toleration was first used in English in the 1510s to mean "permission granted by authority, licence" from the French tolération (originally from the Latin past participle stem of tolerare, tolerationem), moving towards the meaning of "forbearance, sufferance" in the 1580s. The notion of religious toleration stems from Sebastian Castellio and the Toleration Act 1688.

Declaration of the Rights of Man and of the Citizen

The Declaration of the Rights of Man and of the Citizen (1789), adopted by the National Constituent Assembly during the French Revolution, states in Article 10: "No-one shall be interfered with for his opinions, even religious ones, provided that their practice does not disturb public order as established by the law." ("Nul ne doit être inquiété pour ses opinions, mêmes religieuses, pourvu que leur manifestation ne trouble pas l'ordre public établi par la loi.")

In the nineteenth century

Mill
In "On Liberty" (1859) John Stuart Mill concludes that opinions ought never to be suppressed, stating, "Such prejudice, or oversight, when it [i.e. false belief] occurs, is altogether an evil; but it is one from which we cannot hope to be always exempt, and must be regarded as the price paid for an inestimable good." He claims that there are three sorts of beliefs that can be had—wholly false, partly true, and wholly true—all of which, according to Mill, benefit the common good:

Renan

In his 1882 essay "What is a Nation?", French historian and philosopher Ernest Renan proposed a definition of nationhood based on "a spiritual principle" involving shared memories, rather than a common religious, racial or linguistic heritage. Thus members of any religious group could participate fully in the life of the nation. "You can be French, English, German, yet Catholic, Protestant, Jewish, or practicing no religion."

In the twentieth century
In 1948, the United Nations General Assembly adopted Article 18 of the Universal Declaration of Human Rights, which states:
 Everyone has the right to freedom of thought, conscience and religion; this right includes freedom to change his religion or belief, and freedom, either alone or in community with others and in public or private, to manifest his religion or belief in teaching, practice, worship and observance
Even though not formally legally binding, the Declaration has been adopted in or influenced many national constitutions since 1948. It also serves as the foundation for a growing number of international treaties and national laws and international, regional, national and sub-national institutions protecting and promoting human rights including the freedom of religion.

Tolerance and digital technologies 
The development of new digital technologies has resulted in an exponential growth in the volume of information and knowledge available, and made them more readily accessible to greater numbers of people throughout the world. As such, information and communication technologies can play an essential role in the sharing of knowledge and expertise in the service of sustainable development and in a spirit of solidarity. And yet, for many observers, the world is witnessing rising levels of ethnic, cultural and religious intolerance, often using the same communication technologies for ideological and political mobilization to promote exclusivist worldviews. This mobilization often leads to further criminal and political violence and to armed conflict. This also leads to new modes of intolerance such as cyberbullying.

Modern analyses and critiques
Contemporary commentators have highlighted situations in which toleration conflicts with widely held moral standards, national law, the principles of national identity, or other strongly held goals. Michael Walzer notes that the British in India tolerated the Hindu practice of suttee (ritual burning of a widow) until 1829. On the other hand, the United States declined to tolerate the Mormon practice of polygamy. The French head scarf controversy represents a conflict between religious practice and the French secular ideal. Toleration of the Romani people in European countries is a continuing issue.

Modern definition
Historian Alexandra Walsham notes that the modern understanding of the word "toleration" may be very different from its historic meaning. Toleration in modern parlance has been analyzed as a component of a liberal or libertarian view of human rights. Hans Oberdiek writes, "As long as no one is harmed or no one's fundamental rights are violated, the state should keep hands off, tolerating what those controlling the state find disgusting, deplorable or even debased. This for a long time has been the most prevalent defense of toleration by liberals... It is found, for example, in the writings of American philosophers John Rawls, Robert Nozick, Ronald Dworkin, Brian Barry, and a Canadian, Will Kymlicka, among others."

Isaiah Berlin attributes to Herbert Butterfield the notion that "toleration... implies a certain disrespect. I tolerate your absurd beliefs and your foolish acts, though I know them to be absurd and foolish. Mill would, I think, have agreed."

John Gray states that "When we tolerate a practice, a belief or a character trait, we let something be that we judge to be undesirable, false or at least inferior; our toleration expresses the conviction that, despite its badness, the object of toleration should be left alone." However, according to Gray, "new liberalism—the
liberalism of Rawls, Dworkin, Ackerman and suchlike" seems to imply that "it is wrong for government to discriminate in favour of, or against, any form of life animated by a definite conception of the good".

John Rawls' "theory of 'political liberalism' conceives of toleration as a pragmatic response to the fact of diversity". Diverse groups learn to tolerate one another by developing "what Rawls calls 'overlapping consensus': individuals and groups with diverse metaphysical views or 'comprehensive schemes' will find reasons to agree about certain principles of justice that will include principles of toleration".

Herbert Marcuse wrote A Critique of Pure Tolerance in 1965 where he argued that the "pure tolerance" that permits all favors totalitarianism, democracy, and tyranny of the majority, and insisted the "repressive tolerance" against them.

Tolerating the intolerant

Walzer, Karl Popper and John Rawls have discussed the paradox of tolerating intolerance. Walzer asks "Should we tolerate the intolerant?" He notes that most minority religious groups who are the beneficiaries of tolerance are themselves intolerant, at least in some respects. Rawls argues that an intolerant sect should be tolerated in a tolerant society unless the sect directly threatens the security of other members of the society. He links this principle to the stability of a tolerant society, in which members of an intolerant sect in a tolerant society will, over time, acquire the tolerance of the wider society.

Other criticisms and issues
Toleration has been described as undermining itself via moral relativism: "either the claim self-referentially undermines itself or it provides us with no compelling reason to believe it. If we are skeptical about knowledge, then we have no way of knowing that toleration is good."

Ronald Dworkin argues that in exchange for toleration, minorities must bear with the criticisms and insults which are part of the freedom of speech in an otherwise tolerant society. Dworkin has also questioned whether the United States is a "tolerant secular" nation, or is re-characterizing itself as a "tolerant religious" nation, based on the increasing re-introduction of religious themes into conservative politics. Dworkin concludes that "the tolerant secular model is preferable, although he invited people to use the concept of personal responsibility to argue in favor of the tolerant religious model."

In The End of Faith, Sam Harris asserts that society should be unwilling to tolerate unjustified religious beliefs about morality, spirituality, politics, and the origin of humanity, especially beliefs that promote violence.

See also
 A Critique of Pure Tolerance
 Anekantavada
 International Day for Tolerance
 Religious discrimination
 Religious intolerance
 Religious liberty
 Religious persecution
 Religious pluralism
 The Death Camp of Tolerance
 Zero tolerance

Sources

References

Further reading

External links

 Background to the United Nations Universal Declaration of Human Rights
 History of Religious Tolerance
 Outline for a Discussion on Toleration (Karen Barkey)
 Religion and Foreign Policy Initiative, Council on Foreign Relations
 
 Teaching Tolerance
 Test Yourself for Hidden Bias
 Text of the United Nations Universal Declaration of Human Rights
 Toleration, BBC Radio 4 discussion with Justin Champion, David Wootton & Sarah Barber (In Our Time, 20 May 2004)

Religion and politics
Religion